Malvern House Preparatory School, at Kearsney, Kent, was a preparatory school which specialised in preparing boys for entry to the Royal Naval College at Dartmouth.

Notable pupils
Armar Lowry-Corry, 5th Earl Belmore, attended the school from 1881 to 1883.
The comic writer P. G. Wodehouse was at the school from 1891 to 1893.<ref>David A. Jasen, P. G. Wodehouse – A Portrait of a Master (2012), p. 26</ref>

Fictional Malvern House School
In 1915, P. G. Wodehouse gave the school's name to a fictional school, relocated to the equally fictional Bramley-on-Sea on the south coast of England, where Bertie Wooster, Gussie Fink-Nottle, and Kipper Herring studied in their early years, under the Rev. Aubrey Upjohn, headmaster.

Bertie Wooster and Kipper Herring, while having breakfast in the novel Jeeves in the Offing, spoke unfavourably of the Malvern House food, and in particular of the sausages on Sundays and the boiled mutton with caper sauce. The sausages were later mentioned in a newspaper review of Upjohn's reminiscences, when Bobbie Wickham added Kipper's remark to his draft review that the sausages were made, "not from content pigs but pigs that had expired, regretted by all, of glanders, the botts and tuberculosis". This resulted in Upjohn launching a libel action.

Gussie Fink-Nottle and Catsmeat Potter-Pirbright also attended the school. So did Stilton Cheesewright, an enemy of Bertie, as Bertie says they were at private school, Eton and Oxford together.

Notes

P. G. Wodehouse locations